True to My Music is the sixth studio album of the Filipino trio Apo Hiking Society. It is a 10-track album released in 1983 under Universal Records.

Track listing
 "True to My Music" - 03:21
 "When I Met You" - 4:19
 "Kung May Problema" - 03:30
 "Hiwaga" - 03:16
 "Oh Mahal Ko" - 03:23
 "Yakap sa Dilim" - 03:01
 "Words" - 03:46
 "Still Hung Up on You" - 03:54
 "Kumot at Unan" - 03:46
 "Dream of Me" - 3:03

Related links
The Official Apo Hiking Society Website 

1983 albums
APO Hiking Society albums